The Sicard Hollow Athletic Complex is a multi-purpose sports complex in Vestavia Hills, Alabama, a suburb of Birmingham. The facility hosts the Vestavia Hills Soccer Club, a youth soccer program for the community, and used to host the Birmingham Hammers, a National Premier Soccer League club, until they were dissolved in 2018 to make way for Birmingham Legion FC, a USL Championship team. The main stadium seats 1,500 spectators.

External links 
 Official Website

Buildings and structures in Jefferson County, Alabama
National Premier Soccer League stadiums
2011 establishments in Alabama
Sports venues completed in 2011
Sports complexes in the United States
Birmingham Hammers
Soccer venues in Alabama